Chorocidaris micca is a species of sea urchins of the Family Cidaridae. Their armour is covered with spines. Chorocidaris micca was first scientifically described in 1941 by Ikeda.

See also 

 Chondrocidaris brevispina
 Chondrocidaris gigantea
 Cidaris

References 

Animals described in 1941
Cidaridae